Personal finance is the financial management which an individual or a family unit performs to budget, save, and spend monetary resources over time, taking into account various financial risks and future life events.

When planning personal finances, the individual would consider the suitability to his or her needs of a range of banking products (checking, savings accounts, credit cards and consumer loans) or investment in private equity, (companies' shares, bonds, mutual funds) and insurance (life insurance, health insurance, disability insurance) products or participation and monitoring of and- or employer-sponsored retirement plans, social security benefits, and income tax management.

History 
Before a specialty in personal finance was developed, various disciplines which are closely related to it, such as family economics, and consumer economics were taught in various colleges as part of home economics for over 100 years.

The earliest known research in personal finance was done in 1920 by Hazel Kyrk. Her dissertation at University of Chicago laid the foundation of consumer economics and family economics. Margaret Reid, a professor of Home Economics at the same university, is recognized as one of the pioneers in the study of consumer behavior and Household behavior.

In 1947, Herbert A. Simon, a Nobel laureate, suggested that a decision-maker did not always make the best financial decision because of limited educational resources and personal inclinations. In 2009, Dan Ariely suggested the 2008 financial crisis showed that human beings do not always make rational financial decisions, and the market is not necessarily self-regulating and corrective of any imbalances in the economy.

Personal finance education is crucial in enabling individuals and families to make sound financial decisions over the course of their lives. Historically, prior to 1990, the study of personal finance received little attention from mainstream economists and business faculties.However, several American universities such as Brigham Young University, Iowa State University, and San Francisco State University have started to offer financial educational programs in both undergraduate and graduate programs in the last 30 years. These institutions have published several works in journals such as The Journal of Financial Counseling and Planning and the Journal of Personal Finance. Research into personal finance is based on several theories such as social exchange theory and andragogy (adult learning theory). Professional bodies such as American Association of Family and Consumer Sciences and the American Council on Consumer Interests started to play an important role in the development of this field from the 1950s to 1970s. The establishment of the Association for Financial Counseling and Planning Education (AFCPE) in 1984 at Iowa State University and the Academy of Financial Services (AFS) in 1985 marked an important milestone in personal finance history. Attendances of the two societies mainly come from faculty and graduates from business and home economics colleges. AFCPE has since offered several certifications for professionals in this field such as Accredited Financial Counselor (AFC) and Certified Housing Counselors (CHC). Meanwhile, AFS cooperates with Certified Financial Planner (CFP Board).

As the concerns about consumers' financial capability have increased in recent years, a variety of education programs have emerged, catering to a broad audience or to a specific group of people such as youth and women. The educational programs are frequently known as "financial literacy". However, there was no standardized curriculum for personal finance education until after the 2008 financial crisis. The United States President's Advisory Council on Financial Capability was set up in 2008 in order to encourage financial literacy among the American people. It also stressed the importance of developing a standard in the field of financial education.

Personal finance principles 

Personal circumstances differ considerably, with respect to patterns of income, wealth, and consumption needs.  Tax and finance laws also differ from country to country, and market conditions vary geographically and over time.  This means that advice appropriate for one person might not be appropriate for another.  A financial advisor can offer personalized advice in complicated situations and for high-wealth individuals, but University of Chicago professor Harold Pollack and personal finance writer Helaine Olen argue that in the United States good personal finance advice boils down to a few simple points:
 Pay off your credit card balance every month, in full
 Save 20% of your income
 Create an emergency fund
 Maximize contributions to tax-advantaged funds such as a 401(k) retirement funds, individual retirement accounts, and 529 education savings plans
 When investing savings:
 Don't attempt to trade individual securities
 Avoid high-fee and actively managed funds
 Look for low-cost,  diversified mutual funds that balance risk vs. reward appropriately to your target retirement year
 If using a financial advisor, require them to commit to a fiduciary duty to act in your best interest

The limits stated by laws may be different in each country; in any case personal finance should not disregard correct behavioral principles: people should not develop attachment to the idea of money, morally reprehensible, and, when investing, should maintain the medium-long-term horizon avoiding hazards in the expected return of investment.

Personal financial planning process 

The key component of personal finance is financial planning, which is a dynamic process that requires regular monitoring and re-evaluation. In general, it involves five steps:
 Assessment: A person's financial situation is assessed by compiling simplified versions of financial statements including balance sheets and income statements. A personal balance sheet lists the values of personal assets (e.g., car, house, clothes, stocks, bank account, cryptocurrencies), along with personal liabilities (e.g., credit card debt, bank loan, mortgage). A personal income statement lists personal income and expenses.
 Goal setting: Having multiple goals is common, including a mix of short- and long-term goals. For example, a long-term goal would be to "retire at age 65 with a personal net worth of $1,000,000," while a short-term goal would be to "save up for a new computer in the next month." Setting financial goals helps to direct financial planning. Goal setting is done with an objective to meet specific financial requirements.
 Plan creation: The financial plan details how to accomplish the goals. It could include, for example, reducing unnecessary expenses, increasing the employment income, or investing in the stock market.
 Execution: Execution of a financial plan often requires discipline and perseverance. Many people obtain assistance from professionals such as accountants, financial planners, investment advisers, and lawyers.
 Monitoring and reassessment: As time passes, the financial plan is monitored for possible adjustments or reassessments.

Typical goals that most adults and young adults have are paying off credit card/student loan/housing/car loan debt, investing for retirement, investing for college costs for children, paying medical expenses.

Need for Personal Finance

There is a great need for people to understand and take control of their personal finances. These are some of the overarching reasons for it;

1. No formal education for personal finance: Most countries have a formal education across most disciplines or areas of study.

 Individuals pursue to learn in order to earn a livelihood. 
 Their pursuit translates to earning tangible outcomes in the form of money. 
 Even when we realize the above to be a primary objective, there is no formal education at an elementary level in schools or colleges to learn money management or personal finance. 
 Hence, it is important to understand this gap or disconnect in the education system where there is no formal way of equipping an individual to manage his or her own money.

This illustrates the need to learn personal finance from an early stage, in order to differentiate between needs vs. wants and plan accordingly.

2. Shortened employable age: Over the years, with the advent of automation  and changing needs; it has been witnessed across the globe that several jobs that require manual intervention, or that are mechanical in nature are increasingly becoming redundant.

 Several employment opportunities are shifting from countries with higher labor costs to countries with lower labor costs keeping margins low for companies. 
 In economies with a considerably large younger population entering the workforce who are more equipped with latest technologies, several employees in the middle management who have not up-skilled are easily replaceable with new and fresh talent that are cheaper and more valuable to the organizations. 
 Cyclical nature of several industries like automobile, chemicals, construction; consumption and demand is driven by the health of the countries' economy. It has been observed that when economies stagnate, are in recession, in war - certain industries suffer more compared to others. This results in companies rationalizing their workforce. An individual can lose his/her job easily and remain unemployed for a considerable time. All these reasons bring to the realization that the legal employable age of 60 is slowly and gradually becoming shorter.

These are some of the reasons why individuals should start planning for their retirement and systematically build on their retirement corpus, hence the need for personal finance.

3. Increased life expectancy: With the developments in healthcare, people today are living till a much older age than their forefathers. The average life expectancy have changed over the years and people even in developing economies are living much longer. The average life expectancy has gradually shifted from 60 to 81 and upwards. Increased life expectancy coupled with a shorter employable age reinforces the need of having a large enough retirement corpus and the importance of personal finance.

4. Rising medical expenses: Medical expenses including cost of drugs, hospital admission care and charges, nursing care, specialized care, geriatric care have all seen an exponential rise over the years. Many of these medical expenses are not covered through the insurance policies that might either be private/individual insurance coverage or through federal or national insurance coverage.

 In developed markets like the US, insurance coverage is provided by either the employers, private insurers or through federal government (Medicare, primarily for senior citizens or Medicaid, primarily for individuals of lower income levels). However, with the rising US fiscal deficit and large proportion of geriatric population it needs to be seen the extent of the Medicare program being sustainable in the long run, therapy exclusions in the coverage, co-pay, deductibles - there are several cost elements that are to be borne by individuals on a continual basis. 
 In other developed markets like the EU, most of the medical care is nationally reimbursed. This leads to the national healthcare budgets being very tightly controlled. Many newer, expensive therapies are frequently excluded from national formularies. This means that patients may not have access through the government policy and would have to pay out of pocket to avail these medicines
 In developing countries like India, China, most of the expenses are out of pocket as there is no overarching government social security system covering medical expenses.

These reasons illustrate the need of having medical, accidental, critical illness, life coverage insurance for oneself and ones family as well as the need for emergency corpus; translating the immense need for personal finance.

Areas of focus 
Key areas of personal financial planning, as suggested by the Financial Planning Standards Board, are:
 Financial position: is concerned with understanding the personal resources available by examining net worth and household cash flow.  Net worth is a person's balance sheet, calculated by adding up all assets under that person's control, minus all liabilities of the household, at one point in time.  Household cash flow totals up all the expected sources of income within a year, minus all expected expenses within the same year.  From this analysis, the financial planner can determine to what degree and in what time the personal goals can be accomplished.
 Adequate protection: or insurance, the analysis of how to protect a household from unforeseen risks.  These risks can be divided into liability, property, death, disability, health and long-term care.  Some of these risks may be self-insurable while most will require the purchase of an insurance contract.  Determining how much insurance to get, at the most cost effective terms requires knowledge of the market for personal insurance.  Business owners, professionals, athletes and entertainers require specialized insurance professionals to adequately protect themselves.  Since insurance also enjoys some tax benefits, utilizing insurance investment products may be a critical piece of the overall investment planning.
 Tax planning: typically, the income tax is the single largest expense in a household. Managing taxes is not a question whether or not taxes will be paid, but when and how much.  The government gives many incentives in the form of tax deductions and credits, which can be used to reduce the lifetime tax burden.  Most modern governments use a progressive tax.  Typically, as one's income grows, a higher marginal rate of tax must be paid.  Understanding how to take advantage of the myriad tax breaks when planning one's personal finances can make a significant impact.
 Investment and accumulation goals: planning how to accumulate enough money for large purchases and life events is what most people consider to be financial planning.  Major reasons to accumulate assets include, purchasing a house or car, starting a business, paying for education expenses, and saving for retirement.
 Achieving these goals requires projecting what they will cost, and when one needs to withdraw funds.  A major risk to the household in achieving their accumulation goal is the rate of price increases over time, or inflation.  Using net present value calculators, the financial planner will suggest a combination of asset earmarking and regular savings to be invested in a variety of investments.  In order to overcome the rate of inflation, the investment portfolio has to get a higher rate of return, which typically will subject the portfolio to a number of risks.  Managing these portfolio risks is most often accomplished using asset allocation, which seeks to diversify investment risk and opportunity.  This asset allocation will prescribe a percentage allocation to be invested in stocks, bonds, cash and alternative investments.  The allocation should also take into consideration the personal risk profile of every investor, since risk attitudes vary from person to person.
Depreciating Assets- One thing to consider with personal finance and net worth goals is depreciating assets. A depreciating asset is an asset that loses value over time or with use. A few examples would be the vehicle that a person owns, boats, and capitalized expenses. They add value to a person's life but unlike other assets they do not make money and should be a class of their own. In the business world, for tax and bookkeeping purposes, these are depreciated over time due to the fact that their useful life runs out. This is known as accumulated depreciation and the asset will eventually need to be replaced.
 Retirement planning is the process of understanding how much it costs to live at retirement, and coming up with a plan to distribute assets to meet any income shortfall. Methods for retirement plan include taking advantage of government allowed structures to manage tax liability including: individual (IRA) structures, or employer sponsored retirement plans.
 Estate planning involves planning for the disposition of one's assets after death.  Typically, there is a tax due to the state or federal government when one dies.  Avoiding these taxes means that more of one's assets will be distributed to their heirs.  One can leave their assets to family, friends or charitable groups.
 Delayed gratification: Delayed gratification, or deferred gratification is the ability to resist the temptation for an immediate reward and wait for a later reward. This is thought to be an important consideration in the creation of personal wealth. 
 Cash Management: It is the soul of your financial planning, whether you are an employee or planning your retirement. It is a must for every financial planner to know how much he/she spends prior to his/her retirement so that he/she can save a significant amount. This analysis is a wake-up call as many of us are aware of our income but very few actually track their expenses.
 Revisiting Written Financial Plan Regularly: Make it a habit to monitor your financial plan regularly. An annual review of your financial planning with a professional keeps you well-positioned, and informed about the required changes, if any, in your needs or life circumstances. You should be well- prepared for all sudden curve balls that life inevitably throws in your way.
 Education Planning: With the growing interests on students' loan, having a proper financial plan in place is crucial. Parents often want to save for their kids but end up taking the wrong decisions, which affect the savings adversely. We often observe that, many parents give their kids expensive gifts, or unintentionally endanger the opportunity to obtain the much-needed grant. Instead, one should make their kids prepare for the future and support them financially in their education.
 Real Estate Planning:  Shelter is a basic human need, and as such, it is imperative that one understands how to obtain a place to live and at the same time maintain their financial security.  Housing can be very complicated with decisions regarding buying or renting, mortgages, insurance, taxes, utilities, maintenance, taxes, etc.  Apartment or house?  That question is crucial for any individual as each option has its own pros and cons.
 Buy or Rent: If you choose to buy a house, you can do financial investment with your house and improve your credit score and history. You could make your life more stable. But you should care about the price of the house including down payment, monthly mortgage payment, and other costs. Otherwise, you pay fully. If you choose to rent a house, there is no need to worry about maintenance and no real estate taxes. Then your life will have more flexibility since you can move to wherever you want. But you should care about the rent fee including electricity, water, internet, and parking. If you have a pet, you will also have a pet fee.
 Mortgages: When purchasing a home/real estate, it is important to understand your options. Most people either go with a 15 or 30-year plan. The rate of payment can be a fixed plan, in which it is a constant payment of the same amount over a certain period of time. The other is an ARM mortgage (Adjustable-Rate Mortgage). This rate can be adjusted and agreed upon to be changed in the given plan. Mortgage plans depend on the situation you are in, and it is important to assess your credit score, along with your financial status, when contemplating plans.
 Location / Wants and Needs: When choosing a new home, it is important to take into consideration where you would like to reside, along with qualities that you both want and need in a home. These variables can cause an increase or decrease in the price of an estate. When deciding where you want to live, some things you should consider include, but are not limited to, whether you’d prefer the city or rural area, what length of a commute you want, the importance in quality public schools, what level of safety you’d like to have, the amount of land you want, included amenities, and if you’d like to live close to family. Examples of variables that would affect the value of an estate include, but are not limited to, the quality of school systems in that area, proximity to the community, shopping, and entertainment/recreation, safety levels and crime rates of the neighborhood, amenities, and land size and surrounding developments. It is important to keep all of this in mind when thinking about the future value of a home, and, if you are buying, how much it will be worth if you’d like to sell it later.
 Costs: Real estate can be an expensive venture. A planner must take into account all sorts of costs such as mortgage, maintenance, taxes, utilities, insurance etc. What mortgage plan are you looking at: fixed vs ARM? 15 year vs 30 year? Oh no, a tree just fell on your roof; how are you going to fix it, with your own time and work or with cash to hire a handyman? Homeowner's insurance is a must, however, what should be covered can be tricky. Can you get by with just a basic plan covering aspects such as dwelling and loss of use, or, do you require additional coverage such as flood insurance. Own a house? Prepare for property tax. The heat won't stay on itself, your energy company needs its cut, and the same goes for electricity and water. Keeping all these aspects in mind, it is no question that there are many associated costs with real estate.

 Education and tools 

According to a survey done by Harris Interactive, 99% of the adults agreed that personal finance should be taught in schools. Financial authorities and the American federal government had offered free educational materials online to the public. However, according to a Bank of America poll, 42% of adults were discouraged while 28% of adults thought that personal finance is a difficult subject because of vast amount of information available online. As of 2015, 17 out of 50 states in the United States requires high school students to study personal finance before graduation. The effectiveness of financial education on general audience is controversial. For example, a study done by Bell, Gorin and Hogarth (2009) stated that those who undergo financial education were more likely to use a formal spending plan. Financially educated high school students are more likely to have a savings account with regular savings, fewer overdrafts and more likely to pay off their credit card balances. However, another study was done by Cole and Shastry (Harvard Business School, 2009) found that there were no differences in saving behaviours of people in American states with financial literacy mandate enforced and the states without a literacy mandate.

Kiplinger publishes magazines on personal finance.

 See also 

 Accounting software
 Asset allocation
 Asset location
 Corporate finance
 Debt consolidation
 Equity investment
 Estate planning
 Family planning
 List of personal finance software
 Microeconomics
 Money management
 Personal budget
 Separately managed account
 Wealth management

 References 

 Further reading 
 
Kwok, H., Milevsky, M., and Robinson, C. (1994) Asset Allocation, Life Expectancy, and Shortfall, Financial Services Review, 1994, vol 3(2), pg. 109–126.Rich Dad Poor Dad: What the Rich Teach Their Kids About Money That the Poor and Middle Class Do Not!'', by Robert Kiyosaki and Sharon Lechter. Warner Business Books, 2000.

External links